Sliver of Truth is a novel by bestselling author Lisa Unger. It is the second book featuring Ridley Jones and follows Beautiful Lies.

Awards and honors
Sliver of Truth was a BookSense pick and Literary Guild & Doubleday Book Club Main Selection

References

2007 American novels
American crime novels
Novels by Lisa Unger
Shaye Areheart Books books